Sericostomatoidea is a superfamily in the order Trichoptera, the caddisflies.

Families include:
Anomalopsychidae
Antipodoeciidae 
Barbarochthonidae  
Beraeidae
Calocidae
Chathamiidae
Conoesucidae                     
Helicophidae   
Helicopsychidae – snail-case caddisflies   
Hydrosalpingidae   
Petrothrincidae   
Sericostomatidae

References

Insect superfamilies
Integripalpia